Transair may refer to:

Transair (Australia), a defunct airline, formerly based in Australia
Transair (Canada), a defunct airline, formerly based in Canada
Transair (Senegal), a regional airline based in Senegal
Transair (UK), a defunct airline, formerly based in the United Kingdom
Trans Executive Airlines of Hawaii, dba Transair, a cargo and charter airline based in the United States
Transair Georgia, an airline based in Georgia
Transair Sweden, a charter airline from Sweden that operated until 1981